Guillaume Farinier (died 1361) was a French Franciscan from Aquitaine. He became Minister General of the Order of Friars Minor in 1348.

He taught theology at the University of Toulouse. He was created Cardinal in 1356.

Notes

External links
Biography

1361 deaths
French Friars Minor
14th-century French cardinals
Year of birth unknown
Franciscan cardinals
Ministers General of the Order of Friars Minor